Duddington is a small village in Northamptonshire, England. The village is on the east bank of the River Welland which is the county boundary of Rutland.

The Civil parishes of Duddington and Fineshade were amalgamated in 1988.

History
The villages name means 'Farm/settlement connected with Dud(d)a/Dod(d)a'.

Duddington appears in the Domesday survey as Dodintone.

Church
The church, a Grade II Listed Building, is dedicated to Saint Mary and is made of stone in the Norman and Early English styles. It was built in the late 12th century, with additions in the next two centuries. The chancel was rebuilt and the church restored in 1844.

Manor House
The Manor House is a Grade II Listed Building, and has belonged to the Jackson family since it was built. The datestone says NI1633, (NI taken to be to Nicholas Jackson), and extended during the 18th and 19th Centuries. The building is of squared coursed limestone with ashlar dressings and a Collyweston slate roof.

Mill

A mill is mentioned in the Domesday record for Dodingtone, but the present building is probably 17th century with later additions.  It has datestones for 1664, 1724 and 1793 reflecting different phases of work on the building. The mill has been used as offices since the 20th century.

The mill featured in the wartime series of paintings Recording Britain, painted by S.R. Badmin in 1940.  This watercolour is now in the collection of the Victoria and Albert Museum.

The flow of the Welland is held back by a Weir and a mill-leet provided to feed the (now empty) wheel chamber of the mill.

Bridge
A limestone ashlar bridge with four arches, dating from the fifteenth century but widened in 1919. The bridge crosses the Welland, which forms parish and county boundaries.

Community
The 2011 census recorded 281 persons in the civil parish (Duddington and Fineshade) in 119 households, at 0.2 persons per Hectare.

The ecclesiastical parish of Duddington is part of the Deanery  of Rutland.  The incumbent at St Mary's church is The Revd Geoff Angell.

The village pub is the Royal Oak.

The village is served by the 404 bus route Stamford-Peterborough and the 47 between Peterborough and Oakham.

See also 
 Fineshade Priory
 Fineshade Wood

References

External links 

 Duddington at Streetmap.co.uk
 Report into the state of the weir, and proposals for repair, 2011

Villages in Northamptonshire
North Northamptonshire